Iisakki Hoikka (2 April 1840 - 6 December 1917) was a Finnish farmer and politician, born in Kemi. He was a member of the Diet of Finland from 1882 to 1899 and of the Parliament of Finland from 1907 to 1908 and again from 1909 to 1910, representing the Finnish Party.

References

1840 births
1917 deaths
People from Kemi
People from Oulu Province (Grand Duchy of Finland)
Finnish Lutherans
Finnish Party politicians
Members of the Diet of Finland
Members of the Parliament of Finland (1907–08)
Members of the Parliament of Finland (1909–10)
19th-century Lutherans